Nenjiang–Greater Khingan Forest railway or Nenlin railway, is a single-track railroad in northeastern China between Nenjiang and the town of Gulian, in Mohe County.  It is also known as the Nenjiang–Mohe railway or Nenmo railway.  Both of the railway's terminals are located in Heilongjiang Province.  In between, the line traverses the Greater Khingan range of Inner Mongolia.  Much of the line is located within the jurisdiction of the Greater Khingan Forest District, a special forestry prefecture that covers parts of both Inner Mongolia and Heilongjiang.

It was built and completed in four sections from 1964 to 1972. Major cities and towns along route include Nenjiang, Jiagedaqi, the prefectural seat, and Mohe, the northernmost county in China.

Line Description
In the south, the Nenlin railway begins in Nenjiang on the eastern bank of the Nen River.  After crossing the river, the line enters Hulunbuir, a prefectural city and formerly a League of Inner Mongolia.  The line heads north and gradually climbs into the Greater Khingan Range.   After following the Gan River to Jiagedaqi, the railroad turns north and reenters Heilongjiang at Tayuan.  It turns northwest at Tahe and follows the panhandle to Mohe, the northernmost county in China.  In the north, the line terminates at Gulian, a town just west of Mohe's county seat.

At Nenjiang, the line intersects with the Fuyu–Nenjiang (Funen) and Nenjiang–Heishanbao railways.  In recent year, the Nenlin and Funen railroads have been collectively referred to as the Fuyu - Xilinji railway.

History
The Nenjiang–Greater Khingan Forest railway was built by the People's Liberation Army's Corps of Engineers.  Construction began in 1964.  The Jiagedaqi to Tahe section was the first to open, in 1966, followed by the Jiagedaqi to Nenjiang section in 1967.  The Tahe to Zhangling section followed in 1968 and the northernmost section from Tahe to Gulian opened in 1972.    In all, 156 soldiers lost their lives during the construction.  They are buried in martyr's cemeteries in Jiagedaqi and Tahe.

Rail connections
 Nenjiang: Fuyu–Nenjiang railway

See also

 List of railways in China
Rail transport in Inner Mongolia

References

Railway lines in China
Rail transport in Heilongjiang
Rail transport in Inner Mongolia